Ubrogepant, sold under the brand name Ubrelvy, is a medication used for the acute (immediate) treatment of migraine with or without aura (a sensory phenomenon or visual disturbance) in adults. It is not indicated for the preventive treatment of migraine. Ubrogepant is a small-molecule calcitonin gene-related peptide receptor antagonist. It is the first drug in this class approved for the acute treatment of migraine.

The most common side effects are nausea, tiredness and dry mouth. Ubrogepant is contraindicated for co-administration with strong CYP3A4 inhibitors.

History
Ubrogepant, also known as MK-1602, was discovered by scientists at Merck.

The effectiveness of ubrogepant for the acute treatment of migraine was demonstrated in two randomized, double-blind, placebo-controlled trials. In these studies, 1,439 adult patients with a history of migraine, with and without aura, received the approved doses of ubrogepant to treat an ongoing migraine. In both studies, the percentages of patients achieving pain freedom two hours after treatment (defined as a reduction in headache severity from moderate or severe pain to no pain) and whose most bothersome migraine symptom (nausea, light sensitivity or sound sensitivity) stopped two hours after treatment were significantly greater among patients receiving ubrogepant (19–21% depending on the dose) compared to those receiving placebo (12%). Patients were allowed to take their usual acute treatment of migraine at least two hours after taking ubrogepant. 23% of patients were taking a preventive medication for migraine.

In December 2019, the U.S. Food and Drug Administration approved Ubrelvy produced by Allergan USA, Inc. for treatment of migraine after onset.

References

External links 
 
 

AbbVie brands
Antimigraine drugs
Calcitonin gene-related peptide receptor antagonists
Carboxamides
Trifluoromethyl compounds
Spiro compounds
Piperidinones
Pyridines